Ad Statuas may refer to:
Ad Statuas (Thrace), in ancient Thrace, in present-day Turkey
Mogente, in present-day Spain
San Cesareo, in present-day Italy
Vaspuszta, in present-day Hungary
Várdomb, in present-day Hungary